Malik Risaldi (born 23 October 1996), is an Indonesian professional footballer who plays as a winger for Liga 1 club Madura United.

Club career

PS Timah Babel
He was signed for PS Timah Babel to play in the Liga 2 in the 2017 season.

Persegres Gresik
In 2018, Malik Risaldi signed a contract with Indonesian Liga 2 club Persegres Gresik. He made 21 league appearances and scored 6 goals for Persegres Gresik.

Persela Lamongan
He was signed for Persela Lamongan to play in Liga 1 in the 2019 season. Risaldi made his debut on 17 May 2019 in a match against Madura United. On 23 October 2019, Risaldi scored his first goal for Persela against Persebaya Surabaya in the 63rd minute at the Surajaya Stadium, Lamongan. On 21 December 2019, he scored in a 2–0 win against Semen Padang. Risaldi finished the season with 2 goal in 26 league appearances. In the 2020 season, Risaldi only played 3 times for the club because the league was officially discontinued due to the COVID-19 pandemic.

On 25 October 2021, Risaldi scored his first league goal of the 2021–22 season, scoring the opening goal in a 1–0 win over Persik Kediri. On 4 November, he scored in a 1–3 lose over Persib Bandung.

On 15 January 2022, Risaldi scored the opening goal in a 1–1 draw over Persija Jakarta in the Kapten I Wayan Dipta Stadium. In April 2022, Risaldi officially left Persela, he appeared in 32 matches or for 2,464 minutes. he also collected three goals and two assists this season.

Madura United
Risaldi was signed for Madura United to play in Liga 1 in the 2022–23 season. He made his league debut on 23 July 2022, and also scored his first goal for Madura United  in a 8–0 home win against PS Barito Putera. On 27 August 2022, he scored the opening goal for the club in a 2–1 win over Persikabo 1973.

On 14 January 2023, Risaldi was involved in Madura United's 1–2 away win over Barito Putera, scoring a goal in the 36th minute.

Career statistics

Club

Notes

References

External links
 Malik Risaldi at Soccerway
 Malik Risaldi at Liga Indonesia

1996 births
Living people
Sportspeople from Surabaya
Sportspeople from East Java
Indonesian footballers
Association football midfielders
Liga 2 (Indonesia) players
Liga 1 (Indonesia) players
Persegres Gresik players
Gresik United players
Persela Lamongan players
Madura United F.C. players